Dichostates trilineatus is a species of beetle in the family Cerambycidae. It was described by Hintz in 1912. It is known from Kenya, the Democratic Republic of the Congo, Somalia, Uganda, and Tanzania.

Subspecies
 Dichostates trilineatus similis Breuning, 1938
 Dichostates trilineatus trilineatus Hintz, 1912

References

Crossotini
Beetles described in 1912